The 2nd Lagos State House of Assembly is the legislative branch of the Lagos State Government inaugurated on October 6, 1983, and the assembly ran its course till January 10, 1992. 
The assembly was unicameral with 41 representatives elected from each constituencies of the state.
The Speaker of the 2nd Legislative Assembly was Rt. Hon Oladimeji Longe and the Deputy speaker was Hon Afolabi Oredoyin.
The 3rd Assembly was inaugurated on January 14, 1992, with the emergence of Hon. Shakirudeen Kinyomi as Speaker.

References

1979 establishments in Nigeria
State lower houses in Nigeria
Lagos State House of Assembly